Robert Gary Jewett (November 14, 1934 – September 9, 2015) was an American football player.  

Jewett was born in 1934 in Mason, Michigan, and attended Mason High School.

He played college football for Michigan State University from 1944 to 1957. 

He also played professional football in the National Football League for the Chicago Bears in 1958. He appeared in 12 NFL games and caught 15 passes for 192 yards and one touchdown for the Bears. Jewett lived in Charlotte, Michigan, at the time of his death.

He also played in the Canadian Football League for the Toronto Argonauts in 1961 and 1962. He concluded his professional football career in the United Football League, playing for the Grand Rapids Blazers from 1952 to 1965.

He was married in 1957 to Beverly Joan Young. He later operated a carpet and floor covering business. He also worked as a farmer, grave digger, and school teacher.  He died in 2015 at Charlotte, Michigan.

References

1934 births
2015 deaths
American football ends
Michigan State Spartans football players
Chicago Bears players
Players of American football from Michigan
People from Mason, Michigan
People from Charlotte, Michigan